The Santa Marina Stadium is an 5,000-capacity motorcycle stadium in the Lonigo, Italy. The stadium is situated in the southern part of Lonigo, which itself is 25km south of Vicenza. The stadium is affiliated to the Federazione Motociclistica Italiana.

History
The stadium opened on the on 12 June 1977 hosting the semi finals of the 1977 Speedway World Pairs Championship. Lonigo had previously had a speedway venue from 1947 to 1972.

The stadium has been the home of the World Championship round known as the Speedway Grand Prix of Italy in 1996 and from 2005 to 2008. In addition it has hosted numerous major speedway events, including World and European qualifiers and the Italian Individual Speedway Championship.

In 2021, renovation costing in excess 280,000 euros took place in order to bring the stadium into line with regulatory adaptation that also allowed the venue to be used by other parties and not exclusively speedway and it also set a new capacity of 5,000 instead of 8,000.

The speedway track has a circumference of 334 metres.

See also 
Speedway Grand Prix of Italy

References

Speedway venues in Italy